Bernheim Syndrome is a presumed disorder whereby the right ventricle is severely compressed due to a shift in the ventricular septal wall of the heart leading to heart failure. It was first described by Hippolyte Bernheim in 1910. Today it is questioned whether or not Bernheim Syndrome is its own syndrome or a side effect of other cardiac conditions such as left ventricular heart failure whereby the left ventricle is substantially enlarged which encroaches on the space of the right ventricle.

Signs and symptoms 
Signs and symptoms for Bernheim Syndrome are ill-defined and typically follow those of heart failure. Bernheim distinguished Bernheim Syndrome from the typical heart failure presentation via the engorgement of veins due to congestion without evidence of pulmonary congestion. This is evidence of venous blockage without going into pulmonary circulation and is therefore isolated to the right side of the heart. Case presentations of Bernheim Syndrome include symptoms of hypertension, ronchi in the lungs, edema, vein distention, and signs of poor perfusion. It is important for there to be no presentation of dyspnea nor pulmonary congestion until it is presumed to be a terminal stage of Bernheim Syndrome.

Etiology 
Bernheim Syndrome is believed to be the rightward shift of the ventricular septum compressing the right ventricle without causing pulmonary congestion. This was first described by Hippolyte Bernheim in which he presents 10 patients with signs and symptoms of right sided heart failure whose postmortem autospy revealed a ventricular septum that invaded the right ventricle space. This opposed the traditional view of right sided heart failure, right ventricular hypertrophy, where the right ventricle is enlarged. Bernheim describes right ventricles the size of a slit which was due to the bulging ventricular septum wall.

Bernheim Syndrome is believed to occur in two periods: the anatomic and clinical periods. In the anatomic period, there are no clinical signs of the syndrome but the stenosis of the right ventricle makes it difficult to fill to normal capacity. This is offset by the dilation of the right atrium as it takes in the difference in volume. In the clinical period, there are signs and symptoms present. In the clinical period, there are two stages. In the first stage, clinical signs of venous obstruction due to the right ventricular stenosis become apparent while pulmonary blood flow continues normally. In the second stage, symptoms of poor circulation become apparent such as systemic venous engorgement. It is at this point where the patient appears to be in heart failure.

Diagnosis 
Most cases of Bernheim Syndrome have been identified postmortem in necropsy. A cross-sectional view of the heart muscle will show a greatly reduced right ventricle size. In necropsy, it is typical for the heart and lungs to be weighed with a higher weight indicating a build up of blood in the lungs: pulmonary congestion. The weight of the lungs is therefore expected to be within normal limits to rule out pulmonary congestion (900-1,280g). The weight of the liver was also part of diagnosis with a significantly greater weight than what is in normal limits (1,440-1,680g) indicative of vein distention.

In a clinical setting, Bernheim claims that the presence of isolated right ventricular failure clearly came first with the presence of left ventricular hypertrophy coming secondary indicates the presence of his syndrome. This is especially considered when the heart failure is not due to a weakness in the myocardium but instead stenosis of the myocardial wall. Fluoroscopy to view the blood flow in the heart has also been deemed a reliable tool. It would be expected for the left ventricle and right atrium to be enlarged with the other two chambers appearing "normal". However, it was typical to only confirm the presence of Bernheim Syndrome in the setting of autopsy.

History 
It is believed by some in the medical community that Bernheim Syndrome does not actually exist and is only an observed side effect of another condition such as left ventricular hypertrophy. This is because of the lack of a finding of sole right ventricle compression without accompaniment of left ventricular hypertrophy which is expected to encroach into the right ventricular space. It is claimed that there is no observation of a rightward shift of the ventricular septum as is described by Bernheim. Furthermore, using evidence from right and left peak systolic pressures, they determined there was no evidence of right ventricular stenosis to begin with. When right ventricular heart failure is found without left ventricular heart failure, it was accompanied by pulmonary embolism and/or mitral valve stenosis. It is because of theses findings that there has been a movement to remove Bernheim Syndrome from medical terminology.

References

Heart diseases